The 1983 Grand Prix de Tennis de Toulouse was a men's tennis tournament played on indoor Carpet courts in Toulouse, France that was part of the Grand Prix series of the 1983 Grand Prix tennis circuit. It was the second edition of the tournament and was held from 21 November until 27 November 1983. Heinz Günthardt won the singles title.

Finals

Singles

 Heinz Günthardt defeated  Pablo Arraya, 6–0, 6–2

Doubles

 Heinz Günthardt /  Pavel Složil defeated  Bernard Mitton /  Butch Walts, 5–7, 7–5, 6–4

References

External links
 ITF tournament edition details

Grand Prix de Tennis de Toulouse
Grand Prix de Tennis de Toulouse
Grand Prix de Tennis de Toulouse
Grand Prix de Tennis de Toulouse